Castello-Molina di Fiemme (Castèl e Molina in local dialect) is a comune (municipality) in Trentino in the northern Italian region Trentino-Alto Adige/Südtirol, located about  northeast of Trento.

The municipality of Castello-Molina di Fiemme contains the frazioni (subdivisions, mainly villages and hamlets) Predaia and Stramentizzo.

Castello-Molina di Fiemme borders the following municipalities: Carano, Cavalese, Altrei, Valfloriana, Pieve Tesino and Telve.

Demographic evolution

References

Cities and towns in Trentino-Alto Adige/Südtirol